Saremsaqlu (also Romanized as Sāremsāqlū; also known as Sāremsākhlū, Sāram Sākhli, and Sarym-Sogly) is a village in Qareh Poshtelu-e Bala Rural District, Qareh Poshtelu District, Zanjan County, Zanjan Province, Iran. At the 2006 census, its population was 542, in 145 families.

References 

Populated places in Zanjan County